Boynton High School is a secondary school located in San Jose, California and is a continuation school for the Campbell Union High School District.  Between 1990 and 2002 when Boynton High School continuation students attended what was then Blackford High School.  Blackford had been a traditional high school before 1991 when it was closed. After a minor disagreement amongst board members of the Campbell Union High School District, they agreed to rename the continuation high school to Boynton High School, and established a new building on the same lot as Blackford.  The resources of the Blackford High School campus were being shared, and needed to be renovated in order to lease the campus to another school (the former Blackford High School campus is now occupied by neighboring Harker Middle School.).

See also
Santa Clara County high schools
List of closed secondary schools in California

References

 Mayes, Erin.  "Campus to be called 'Boynton' despite faculty, student concerns", The Campbell Reporter.  December 19, 2001.
 History of Boynton High School
 Boynton High School profile provided by schooltree.org

Campbell Union High School District
Educational institutions established in 2002
High schools in San Jose, California
Continuation high schools in California
Public high schools in California
2002 establishments in California